2,5-Dimethoxy-4-(2-fluoroethyl)amphetamine (DOEF; also known as dimethoxyfluoroethylamphetamine) is a lesser-known psychedelic drug and member of the DOx class. DOEF was first synthesized by Alexander Shulgin. In his book PiHKAL, the dosage range is listed as 2–3.5 mg, and the duration is listed as 12–16 hours. Very little data exists about the pharmacological properties, metabolism, and toxicity of DOEF.

See also
 DOET
 DOPF
 DOTFM

References

Substituted amphetamines
Fluoroethyl compounds